Hellboy (stylized in all caps) is the fifth and final mixtape by American rapper Lil Peep. It was self-released on September 25, 2016. The mixtape was promoted by two singles and later a headlining tour, The Peep Show Tour, in the spring of 2017.

Upon Peep's death from a drug overdose in November 2017, a Billboard article mentioned "Girls" as one out of seven songs from the late rapper as one of his best works. In 2019, Pitchfork ranked Hellboy at number 193 in its list of "The 200 Best Albums of the 2010s".

On September 25, 2020, Peep's estate re-released Hellboy to streaming platforms on its fourth anniversary with AUTNMY via AWAL. It released with "drive by" being reproduced with the help of Kyle Dixon and Michael Stein due to sample clearance issues.

Background 
On August 30, 2016, Peep announced the mixtape would be releasing on September 25, 2016, on his Twitter account. Originally, the mixtape was going to consist of eight tracks. Seven of them remained on the final project, two with adjusted names. However, the day before the mixtape dropped, Peep released an updated tracklist. "Honestly", the song left off of the project's initial release; produced by frequent collaborator Horse Head, was later released as a single on all streaming platforms in December 2016.

The album cover features Lil Peep standing, looking down at the ground, while wearing a New Jersey Devils hockey jersey. It was photographed by Miller Rodríguez. In a filmed interview for GQ in 2017, Peep had explained that he had read Hellboy comics and was a fan of the character. Hellboy was commercially released on September 25, 2020.

Critical reception 

In an article from The New Yorker on the emergence of "sad rap" rising to mainstream prominence in 2017, "OMFG" was described as a "standout on his mixtape [Hellboy]". In 2019, Pitchfork ranked Hellboy at number 193 in their list of "The 200 Best Albums of the 2010s"; executive editor Matthew Schnipper wrote: "His music assures you that you’re not alone—and if you haven't, he gives you a glimpse of what that suffering feels like."

Track listing 
Credits derived from Spotify and Genius.

Notes
All titles are stylized in all lowercase except for "OMFG".
"Hellboy" samples the rock band Underoath's 2008 song "Too Bright to See, Too Loud to Hear".
"Drive By" samples the intro of Kyle Dixon's song "Castle Byers". This sample is replaced in the re-released version, where production credits also go to Kyle Dixon and Michael Stein.
"OMFG" contains a sample of "I'll Not Contain You" by The Microphones.
"The Song They Played (When I Crashed Into the Wall)" samples an acoustic performance by Tom DeLonge.
"Fucked Up" samples Toe's song "My Little Wish".
"Cobain" samples Owen's song "Bad News".
"Gucci Mane" samples Minor2Go's loop "Lonely 1".
"Interlude" samples the ending of Modest Mouse's song "Life Like Weeds".
"Worlds Away" samples Bright Eyes' song "Something Vague".
"Red Drop Shawty" samples Minor2Go's loop "Anxi".
"Nose Ring" samples From Autumn to Ashes' song "No Trivia".
"We Think Too Much" sample Aphex Twin's song "Lichen".
"The last Thing I Wanna Do" samples the intro of The Story So Far's song "Navy Blue".
"Walk Away as the Door Slams" samples +44's song "155 (Acoustic Version)".
"Move On, Be Strong" samples Avenged Sevenfold's song "Unholy Confessions".

Charts

References 

2016 mixtape albums
Lil Peep albums
Self-released albums